There have been several Sieges of Temesvár (today: Timișoara) in history of Hungary:
 Siege of Temesvár (1514)
 Siege of Temesvár (1551)
 Siege of Temesvár (1552)
 Siege of Temeşvar (1596)
 Siege of Temeşvar (1689)
 Siege of Temeşvar (1696)

 Siege of Temeşvar (1716)
 Siege of Temesvár (1849)
 Siege of Timişoara (1944)